A list of films produced in Italy in 1949 (see 1949 in film):

References

External links
Italian films of 1949 at the Internet Movie Database

Italian
1949
Films